Constructed in 1896, the Collins and Reidsville Railroad (C&R) ran about  between Collins and Reidsville, Georgia, USA.  In 1906 the C&R was part of a merger that formed the Georgia Coast and Piedmont Railroad.

Defunct Georgia (U.S. state) railroads
Railway companies established in 1896 
American companies established in 1896 
1906 disestablishments
1896 establishments in Georgia (U.S. state)
1906 disestablishments in Georgia (U.S. state)